Megachile rugifrons is a species of bee in the family Megachilidae. It was described by Smith in 1854.

References

Rugifrons
Insects described in 1854